Bianca Farella (born April 10, 1992) is a Canadian rugby player. In 2016, she was named to Canada's first ever women's rugby sevens Olympic team.

At the age of 13, Farella chose to join rugby as her spring sport due to her preference for team sports and because her high school Miss Edgar's and Miss Cramp's School only offered tennis, badminton, and rugby as spring sports. In CEGEP, Farella joined the Dawson College Blues. She was a three-time all-star and the team MVP.

During her one-year playing with the Concordia Stingers in 2012, she led the Quebec university women's rugby conference in tries scored (12 tries for 60 points). She was named the RSEQ Conference All-Star, RSEQ Rookie of the Year, CIS Rookie of the Year, and CIS All-Star. After her stellar performance in the CIS, Farella went to British Columbia to join the centralized women's Rugby Canada program.

After one year with the national team, she was part of the squad that won silver at the 2013 Rugby World Cup Sevens. At the 2014 FISU in Brazil, Farella captained the Canadian team to gold. A year later, she missed the 2015 Pan Am Games to undergo shoulder surgery. Farella rejoined the national squad during the second leg of the 2015-16 World Rugby Women's Sevens Series in São Paulo. By the season's end, Farella ranked ninth in the world with 315 career series points (and second, behind Ghislaine Landry, for all-time in series tries for Canada with 63 points.

In June 2021, Farella was named to Canada's 2020 Summer Olympics team.

Achievements and honours 
 2017, Canada Sevens Langford dream team
2018, Rugby Canada Player of the Year (7s)

References

External links
 Bianca Farella at Rugby Canada
 
 
 
 

1992 births
Living people
Canadian female rugby union players
Sportspeople from Montreal
Rugby sevens players at the 2016 Summer Olympics
Olympic rugby sevens players of Canada
Canada international rugby sevens players
Female rugby sevens players
Olympic bronze medalists for Canada
Olympic medalists in rugby sevens
Medalists at the 2016 Summer Olympics
Rugby sevens players at the 2020 Summer Olympics
Canada international women's rugby sevens players
Rugby sevens players at the 2022 Commonwealth Games